Jón Trausti Sigurðarson (born 4 January 1982) is an Icelandic marketing director and lawyer, best known for founding the Reykjavík-based, English language magazine Reykjavik Grapevine with Hilmar Grétarsson and Valur Gunnarsson. The newspaper, which Sigurðarson helped to establish, now has a circulation of almost 50,000.

References

External links 
 

1982 births
Living people
Jon Trausti Sigurdarson